Ipnus or Ipnos was a town of the Ozolian Locrians, of uncertain site.

Its site is unlocated.

References

Populated places in Ozolian Locris
Former populated places in Greece
Lost ancient cities and towns